Sandspit Beach is a beach located in south west of Karachi, Sindh, Pakistan. It is a very famous tourist spot. 

A remarkable variety of marine life are found here including algae and crabs. The shallow waters are ideal for swimming and sunbathing. It has an unusual rocky formation. Sandspit Beach is quite a popular hangout and relaxation spot in Karachi. Facilities at the Sandspit Beach include horseback and camel riding.

Sandspit Beach is also a nesting ground for green and olive ridley turtles, implemented by the Sindh Wildlife Department over the past two decades. Nesting takes place in early winter months. In recent years the WWF-Pakistan has also become involved in turtle conservation activities by establishing a wetland centre at Sandspit Beach.

References 

Beaches of Karachi
Protected areas of Pakistan